The Muslim University of Morogoro (MUM) is a private Islamic university in Morogoro, Tanzania. It was founded in 2004. The university has five departments: arts and humanity; Islamic studies; law and sharia; science; and  business studies. MUM offers eight undergraduate degree programs.

References

External links
 

Private universities in Tanzania
Universities in Morogoro
Educational institutions established in 2004
2004 establishments in Tanzania
Association of African Universities